The International Cricket Council (ICC) was founded at Lord's on 15 June 1909 as the Imperial Cricket Conference, with Australia, England, and South Africa as its founding members.

In the beginning, only countries within the Commonwealth could join. India, New Zealand and the West Indies joined in 1926, and Pakistan joined in 1953 after the partition of India. In 1961, South Africa resigned from the Conference due to their leaving the Commonwealth, but they continued to play Test cricket until their international exile in 1970.

The Imperial Cricket Conference was renamed the International Cricket Conference in 1965, with new rules permitting countries from outside the Commonwealth to be elected into the governing body for the first time: Fiji and the USA became the first Associate Member nations that year.

In 1981, Sri Lanka became the first Associate Member to be elected a Full Member, returning the number of Test-playing nations to seven. In 1989, the ICC was again renamed, this time to the International Cricket Council. South Africa was re-elected as a Full Member of the ICC in 1991, with Zimbabwe elected in 1992, and Bangladesh elected in 2000.

On 22 June 2017, Ireland and Afghanistan were granted Full Member (and Test) status, bringing the number of Full Members to 12.

As of August 2022, there are 108 ICC members, with 12 Full Members and 96 Associate Members.

The Membership Committee will consider all future requests for membership – full and associate – against an objective set of criteria. There was previously a third level, Affiliate Membership, which was abolished in June 2017, with all existing Affiliate Members becoming Associate Members, and introducing a two-tier hierarchy (Full Members and Associate Members): any new member elected to the ICC would be an Associate Member, with the possibility of promotion to Full Member status based on ongoing performance in international competition.

From July to October 2019, the ICC suspended Zimbabwe Cricket due to government interference, the first time this had occurred with a Full Member side.

Full Members 

Full Members are the governing bodies for cricket in a country or a group of associated countries representing a geographical area.

All Full Members have a right to send a representative team to play official Test matches, have full voting rights at meetings of the ICC, and are automatically qualified to play ODIs and T20Is. The West Indies cricket team is a combined team representing 15 countries and territories from the Caribbean, while the English cricket team represents both England and Wales and the Irish cricket team represents all of the island of Ireland.

Of these 12 nations, Sri Lanka, Zimbabwe, Bangladesh, Afghanistan and Ireland played as Associate Members before being elected as Full Members.

In April 2021, ICC granted permanent Women's Test status to all the Full Member nations.

Associate Members 

Associate Members are countries where cricket is firmly established and organised, but do not qualify for Full Membership. There are 96 Associate Members.

All Associates were eligible to play in the World Cricket League, a series of international one-day cricket administered by the ICC until 2019. This was replaced by the ICC Cricket World Cup League 2 and ICC Cricket World Cup Challenge League from 2019 onwards. There are also ICC Men's T20 World Cup Qualifier events that works as a qualification process for ICC Men's T20 World Cup: until April 2018, only the qualified teams were awarded Twenty20 International status.

In April 2018, the ICC announced T20I status for all its members from 1 July 2018 for the women's game, and from 1 January 2019 for the men's game.

Denotes members that are currently suspended by the ICC.

Associate Members with ODI status 

The ICC granted men's One Day International status to its Associate Members based on their success in the World Cricket League; the World Cricket League was replaced in 2019 and ODI status now goes exclusively to all teams in the newly created ICC Cricket World Cup Super League and ICC Cricket World Cup League 2.

The Associate teams who currently hold men's ODI status are:

Netherlands ensured they would regain ODI status after the completion of the 2018 World Cup Qualifier, by winning the 2015–2017 World Cricket League. The next three highest placed associates in the qualifier (UAE, Scotland and Nepal) also gained ODI status. In June 2018, Scotland and UAE were added to the main ODI rankings list, with Nepal joining them in January 2019. Netherlands were also added afterwards after playing enough games to gain a ranking.

Four additional teams gained ODI status after the conclusion of the World Cricket League Division Two tournament in April 2019. These teams were Namibia, Oman, Papua New Guinea and USA.

In April 2021, ICC granted permanent Women's One Day International status to all the Full Member teams. On 25 May 2022, five Associate teams were granted Women's ODI status by the International Cricket Council.

Associate Members with T20I status 
In April 2018, the ICC announced T20I status for all  Members from 1 January 2019. Therefore, all Twenty20 matches played between ICC Members since 1 January 2019 have been a full T20I.

Seven nations already had a T20I status before the ICC granted it to every member nations in 2019.
  (Had secured ODI and T20I status from 2018 Cricket World Cup Qualifier)
  (Had secured ODI and T20I status from 2015–2017 ICC World Cricket League Championship)
  (Had secured ODI and T20I status from 2018 Cricket World Cup Qualifier)
  (Had secured ODI and T20I status from 2018 Cricket World Cup Qualifier)
  (Had secured T20I status by qualifying for 2016 ICC World Twenty20)
  (Had secured T20I status by qualifying for 2016 ICC World Twenty20)

Former members

There are six countries who were previously members of the International Cricket Council (as associate and/or affiliate members), but were subsequently expelled:

Dissolved members
There were two combined teams who were members of the International Cricket Council (as associate members), but were subsequently dissolved:
  (representing Kenya, Uganda, Tanzania and Zambia): admitted as an associate member in 1966, the team played at the inaugural Cricket World Cup in 1975, with Kenya becoming an associate member in its own right in 1981. In 2003, the ICC, Zambia and Malawi mutually agreed to dissolve the team, with Zambia becoming an associate member (expelled in 2021) and Malawi becoming an affiliate member (associate member from 2017).
  (representing Gambia, Ghana, Nigeria, and Sierra Leone): admitted as an associate member in 1976. In 2003, the ICC and the constituent countries mutually agreed to dissolve the team, with Nigeria becoming an associate member and the other three nations becoming affiliate members (associate members from 2017).

Regional bodies
Regional bodies aim to organise, promote and develop the game of cricket in their respective ICC regions.

These are the current bodies:
 African Cricket Association
 Asian Cricket Council
 ICC Americas
 ICC East Asia-Pacific
 European Cricket Council

Two further regional bodies were dissolved following the creation of the African Cricket Association:
 East and Central Africa Cricket Conference
 West Africa Cricket Council

References

L
Cricket-related lists